Pocota personata is a species of European hover fly.

Distribution
England.

References

Diptera of Europe
Eristalinae
Insects described in 1780
Taxa named by Moses Harris